The Noojee Trestle Bridge Rail Trail is a short,  rail trail in Noojee, Victoria. As its name suggests, it primarily features an impressive  trestle bridge. The trail follows the alignment of the former Noojee railway line.

Rail trails in Victoria (Australia)
Victorian Heritage Register
Shire of Baw Baw